Agidigbo 88.7 FM is a radio station located in Ibadan, Oyo State, Nigeria. It began broadcasting on 25 March 2021 and is owned by Oriyomi Hamzat, who also serves as an on-air presenter. Hamzat had previously been an online radio host, though his equipment had been seized after he criticized former Oyo State governor Abiola Ajimobi.

With the tagline, ‘the people’s voice’, the station prides itself as the amplifier of the concerns of the common man. It was founded by human rights advocate cum broadcaster, Oriyomi Hamzat thus becoming the first radio station in Ibadan licensed to a broadcast journalist.

Once operating on the internet before it was razed in a fire outbreak in April 2020, the radio station began terrestrial transmission in February, 2021. It started full commercial broadcast on the 15th of March, 2021 and was later commissioned on the 25th of March 2021 by the governor of Oyo State, His Excellency Engineer Oluseyi Abiodun Makinde where the Governor commended the strides of the radio station within few weeks of its establishment as well as the goodwill of its founder.

The radio station which runs Yoruba, English and Pidgin shows appeals to a metropolitan mix of indigenous and contemporary listeners and its unique selling point is its affinity for human angle broadcasting.

The station parades On Air Personalities including Oriyomi Hamzat, Ajibola Akinyefa, Adedotun Amosun ‘Soul’, Yousuph Adebayo Grey, Abdulganeey Abdulrazaq ‘Mr. GRA’, Sekinat Adegoke Yusuph, Adenike Isola, Titlayo Akande, among others.

Its most popular shows include family arbitration programme, Kokoro Alate, socio-political commentaries, Awa Ara Wa and Bo Se Nlo Extra, political interview, National Discourse which has featured former Minister for Youth and Sports, Solomon Dalung, former governor of Ekiti State, Engr. Segun Oni, one time Presidential candidate, Omoyele Sowore amongst other prominent Nigerians.

In the first few weeks of its existence, Agidigbo 88.7 FM continued to make the news for its successive atypical approach to broadcasting. This was reflected in the programming of the radio station which prioritized talk more than music, its newscast which suggests an editorial policy that hinges on human angle stories, original reporting and live correspondence, a hybrid mix of on-air personalities and its decision to run 24 broadcast hours daily.

Agidigbo 88.7 FM also surprised many by appointing a 25-year old broadcast journalist, writer and media personality, Yousuph Adebayo Grey as its Head of Station, the youngest the country has ever seen.

With its investigative show, Digging Deep, Agidigbo 88.7 FM has also affirmed the possibility of investigative journalism on radio. In an interview with Premium Times, its Head of Station noted that, "the most important thing when it comes to sustaining an investigative desk is acknowledging [that] it is your calling and it is something that the people you are broadcasting to deserve. That alone will help you put a lot of effort into sustaining it. Practically, you can’t put ads on it to prevent dilution. We have about 105 programmes on the radio station, so if one is not giving direct revenue, we won’t mind. Also, we are working towards partnering with credible NGOs that support good journalism."

In just about three months of its establishment, Agidigbo 88.7 FM has been applauded for challenging the status quo within the broadcast industry in Ibadan city most importantly with its wide coverage of the 2021 local government elections. The radio station maintains a strong digital presence and it is on track to become one of the most prominent radio brands in Nigeria.

References 

Radio stations in Nigeria
2021 establishments in Nigeria
Radio stations established in 2021